Piero Pioppo (born 29 September 1960) is an Italian prelate of the Catholic Church, who has been Apostolic Nuncio to Indonesia since 2017.

Biography 
Piero Pioppo was born in Savona, in Liguria, on 29 September 1960. He studied at the Pontifical Theological Faculty of Turin.

Piero Pioppo was ordained a priest on 28 June 1985 for the diocese of Acqui First named vicar of a parish at Carcare, he was sent to Rome to continue his studies. He has a degree in dogmatic theology and a degree in canon law from the Pontifical Gregorian University. For a year, he taught Catholic Theology in Alessandria.

In 1991 he completed the course of study at the Pontifical Ecclesiastical Academy. He joined the diplomatic service of the Holy See on 1 July 1993 and then filled assignments in South Korea and Chile, and then in Rome in the General Affairs Section of the Secretariat of State. At the end of 1999, he became the private secretary to Cardinal Angelo Sodano, the Secretary of State.

From 2006 to 2010 he was prelate of the Institute for the Works of Religion (IOR), serving as secretary for the Commission of Cardinals that oversees the IOR.

On 25 January 2010, Piero Pioppo was named apostolic nuncio to Cameroon and Equatorial Guinea and titular archbishop of Torcello. On 18 March he received his episcopal consecration from Cardinal Tarcisio Bertone, the secretary of state.

On 8 September 2017, Pope Francis appointed him apostolic nunciature to Indonesia and on 19 March 2018 also the role of nuncio to the Association of Southeast Asian Nations (ASEAN).

He led the delegation of the Holy See to the October 2018 conference in Bali "Our Ocean, Our Legacy", Pioppo then organized Pope Francis' meeting with Indonesian Maritime Affairs and Fisheries Minister Susi Pudjiastuti in December at which Francis endorsed her aggressive program to restrict illegal fishing.

Notes

See also
 List of heads of the diplomatic missions of the Holy See

References

External links 
 Catholic Hierarchy: Archbishop Piero Pioppo 

1960 births
Living people
People from Savona
Pontifical Gregorian University alumni
Pontifical Ecclesiastical Academy alumni
Apostolic Nuncios to Indonesia
Apostolic Nuncios to Cameroon
Apostolic Nuncios to Equatorial Guinea
Apostolic Nuncios to ASEAN